Purulia Sadar West subdivision was a subdivision of the Purulia district in the state of West Bengal, India, till reorganisation of the subdivisions in Purlia district in 2017.

Subdivisions
Purulia district was divided into the following administrative subdivisions till reorganisation:

Purulia Sadar West subdivision has a density of population of 445 per km2. 35.39% of the population of the district resides in this subdivision.

Administrative units
Purulia Sadar West subdivision has  7 police stations, 7 community development blocks, 7 panchayat samitis, 59 gram panchayats, 882 inhabited villages, 1 municipality, 5 census towns. The single municipality is at Jhalda. The census towns are: Chekya, Begun Kodar, Jaypur, Balarampur, Barabazar. Jhalda, a municipal town, has been included as a census town in the census figures. It is not included as a census town here. The subdivision has its headquarters at Jhalda.

Police stations
Police stations in Purulia Sadar West subdivision have the following features and jurisdiction:

Blocks
Community development blocks in Purulia Sadar West subdivision are:

Gram panchayats
The subdivision contains 59 gram panchayats under 7 community development blocs:

 Jhalda–I block: Ichag, Jhalda–Darda, Mathari–Khamar, Tulin, Ilu–Jargo, Kalma, Noyadih, Hensahatu, Marum Osina and Pusti.
 Jhalda–II block: Bamniya–Belyadih, Chitmu, Nowahatu, Begunkodar, Hirapur Adardih, Rigid, Chekya, Majhidih and Tatuara.  
 Joypur block: Baragram, Joypur, Ropo, Upankahan, Ghagra, Mukundapur and Sidhi–Jamra.  
 Arsha: Arsha, Chatuhansa, Hensla, Puara, Beldih, Hetgugui, Mankiary and Sirkabad. 
 Bagmundi block: Ajodhya, Beergram, Matha, Sindri, Baghmundi, Burda–Kalimati, Serengdih and Tunturi–Suisa.   
 Balarampur block: Balarampur, Bela, Genrua, Tentlow, Baraurma, Darda and Ghatbera–Kerowa.  
 Barabazar block: Banjora, Berada, Latpada, Tumrasole, Bansbera, Bhagabandh, Sindri, Barabazar and Dhelatbamu Sukurhutu.

Electoral constituencies

Lok Sabha (parliamentary) and Vidhan Sabha (state assembly) constituencies in Purulia district were as follows:

References

Purulia district